Vike Church is a parish church of the Church of Norway in Vestnes Municipality in Møre og Romsdal county, Norway. It is located in the village of Vikebukt. It is the church for the Vike  parish which is part of the Indre Romsdal prosti (deanery) in the Diocese of Møre. The white, brick church was built in a long church style in 1970 using plans drawn up by the architect Olav Solheim. The church seats about 200 people.

See also
List of churches in Møre

References

Vestnes
Churches in Møre og Romsdal
Long churches in Norway
Brick churches in Norway
20th-century Church of Norway church buildings
Churches completed in 1970
1970 establishments in Norway